The 2018 Triple J Hottest 100 was announced on 27 January 2019. It is the 26th countdown of the most popular songs of the year, as chosen by listeners of Australian radio station Triple J. A record-breaking number of voters (2.758 million) participated by choosing their top ten songs of 2018.

Ocean Alley's "Confidence" was voted into first place. Ocean Alley also achieved four tracks in the countdown and became the second artist to be voted into No. 1 and No. 100 during the same countdown, after Powderfinger in 1999.

Background 
Triple J's Hottest 100 allows members of the public to vote online for their top ten songs of the year, which are then used to calculate the year's 100 most popular songs. Any song that was released for the first time between 1 December 2017 and 30 November 2018 is eligible for 2018's Hottest 100. Voting opened on 10 December 2018, as announced by Liam Stapleton in a crime mockumentary. Several artists and presenters, including Billie Eilish, Tash Sultana, Amy Shark and Anderson .Paak, made their votes public. The artists most often voted for by Triple J presenters were The Presets, Kwame, Rüfüs Du Sol, and G Flip.

Once voting closed, Triple J announced on 25 January that a total of 2.758 million votes had been cast, breaking the previous year's record by 14%. Triple J also announced that 95% of voters were from Australia and 60% were under the age of 25.

Projections 
Prior to the countdown, bookmakers Sportsbet, Beteasy, Ladbrokes, and social media measurement site 100 Warm Tunas, placed "Confidence" by Australian band Ocean Alley and "This Is America" by American rapper Childish Gambino as the two songs most likely to be voted into first place. Ocean Alley's highest previous performance was No. 48 with "The Comedown" in 2017, whilst Gambino's highest previous performance was No. 5 with "Redbone" in 2016.

Announcement date 

On 27 November 2017, Triple J announced plans to move the Hottest 100 from Australia Day (January 26) to the fourth Saturday of January. This followed a campaign led by Indigenous Australian activists and supporters, calling on Triple J to change the date due to opposition to Australia Day's celebratory commemoration of British settlement. Following the announcement, concerns were raised on social media regarding the 2018 Hottest 100 announcement date, as the fourth Saturday of January 2019 coincides with January 26. Triple J newsreader Avani Dias and content director Ollie Wards stated that the 2019 dates would be reviewed and announced in the future.

On 6 December 2018, Triple J announced that they would hold the countdown on 27 January 2019.

Full list

Artists with multiple entries

Four entries
 Ocean Alley (1, 10, 16, 100)

Three entries
 Billie Eilish (twice solo and once with Khalid) (8, 17, 46)
 Khalid (once with Billie Eilish, once solo and once with Benny Blanco and Halsey) (17, 52, 68)
 Hockey Dad (18, 61, 73)
 Rüfüs Du Sol (22, 23, 50)
 Post Malone (27, 33, 90)
 DMA's (41, 60, 97)

Two entries
 Amy Shark (5, 36)
 Mallrat (7, 70)
 Skegss (11, 71)
 The Wombats (12, 69)
 ASAP Rocky (13, 91)
 Hayden James (15, 78)
 Sarah Aarons (once with The Rubens and once with Peking Duk) (21, 29)
 The Rubens (21, 32)
 Hilltop Hoods (24, 44)
 Thundamentals (25, 92)
 Kendrick Lamar (once with SZA and once with Anderson .Paak) (28, 67)
 Peking Duk (29, 55)
 King Princess (34, 74)
 Ziggy Alberts (37, 42)
 G Flip (38, 62)
 Drake (40, 43)
 Vance Joy (53, 54)
 Halsey (once solo and once with Benny Blanco and Khalid) (56, 68)
 Brockhampton (63, 83)
 Anderson .Paak (67, 85)
 Ruel (87, 89)

Countries represented
 Australia – 65
 United States – 23
 United Kingdom – 11
 Canada – 4
 New Zealand – 3

Top 10 Albums of 2018
The annual Triple J album poll was held across November and December and was announced on 16 December.

References

2018